Alan Leroy Hairston (born December 11, 1945) is an American former professional basketball player and a college and high school head coach. His high school coaching career has garnered him multiple league, district and state championships, as well as numerous individual awards.

A 6'1" (1.85 m) guard from Bowling Green State University, Hairston was selected by the Seattle SuperSonics in the fifth round of the 1968 NBA draft and by the Kentucky Colonels in the 1968 ABA draft. Hairston appeared in two seasons for the Sonics, averaging 2.2 points per game.

After a stint with the NBA Cleveland Cavaliers in 1970-71, Hairston was released. He went into coaching, serving as head coach at Seattle Central College (formerly Seattle Central Community College) 1975-79. He led the team to the Northwest championship in 1977. 

By far, Hairston has made his biggest contributions to the sport of basketball as a prep coach.  Widely regarded as one of the best prep hoops coaches in Washington state history, Hairston achieved great success at the helm of the historically dominant boys hoops program at Garfield High School in Seattle, Washington, including guiding the program to five state titles from 1980 through 1991 (1980, 1983, 1986, 1987, and 1991), and two more state runner-up appearances during the same period (1989 and 1990).  He also successfully coached the Kent-Meridian (Kent, WA) and Seattle O'Dea High School boys basketball programs to post-season appearances.  In assuming the O'Dea post, he took over for the late Phil Lumpkin – also a former NBA basketball player and prep coaching star.

Hairston later served as head coach of the Seattle University men's basketball team (which competed as a member of the National Association of Intercollegiate Athletics – NAIA) and as assistant coach of the University of Washington Husky men's basketball team under former head coach Bob Bender. 

As an assistant Huskies coach during the 1997–98 season, Hairston helped guide a team led by future NBA star Todd McCullough and Donald Watts, Jr. (son of former Seattle Sonic Donald Earl Slick Watts) to the NCAA Sweet 16. There the Washington Huskies lost to a Jim Calhoun coached University of Connecticut team on a buzzer-beater by future NBA star Richard "Rip" Hamilton.

References

1945 births
Living people
American men's basketball players
Basketball coaches from Michigan
Basketball players from Michigan
Bowling Green Falcons men's basketball players
High school basketball coaches in the United States
Junior college men's basketball coaches in the United States
Kentucky Colonels draft picks
People from Mount Clemens, Michigan
Point guards
Seattle Redhawks men's basketball coaches
Seattle SuperSonics draft picks
Seattle SuperSonics players
Shooting guards
Sportspeople from Metro Detroit
Washington Huskies men's basketball coaches